Hal Roach was an American film producer.

Hal Roach can also refer to:

Hal Roach Jr., his son, a film and television producer
Hal Roach (comedian), an Irish comedian